The 2014 Calcutta Football League Premier Division A was the 116th season of the Calcutta Premier Division, a state league within the Indian state of West Bengal.  The fixtures  were kicked off on 16 September 2014,

East Bengal won the title for a record 36th time and also created a record by clinching the title for the 6th consecutive time.

Standings

Results

Top scorers

Source:kolkatafootball.com

8 goals
  Dudu Omagbemi (East Bengal)
  Balwant Singh (Mohun Bagan)
7 goals
  Ranti Martins (East Bengal)
5 goals
  Ashim Biswas (Tollygunge Agragami)
  Pierre Boya (Mohun Bagan))
  Oluwaunmi Somide (Tollygunge Agragami)
4 goals
  Koko Sakibo (Tollygunge Agragami)
3 goals
  Taro Hasegawa (Mohammedan)

References

Calcutta Premier Division
Cal